The 2016 World Rugby Under 20 Championship was the ninth annual international rugby union competition for Under 20 national teams. The event was organised in England by rugby's governing body, World Rugby. Twelve nations took part in the tournament, which was held at two venues in Greater Manchester—AJ Bell Stadium in Salford and Manchester City Academy Stadium in Manchester. New Zealand went into the tournament as defending champions. The competition was won by hosts England.

Teams
The following teams participated in the 2016 World Rugby U20 Championship:

Match officials
The following officials oversaw the thirty matches:

Referees
  Andrew Brace (Ireland)
  Thomas Charabas (France)
  Graham Cooper (Australia)
  Craig Evans (Wales)
  Cwengile Jadezweni (South Africa)
  Craig Maxwell-Keys (England)
  Elia Rizzo (Italy)
  Juan Sylvestre (Argentina)
  Paul Williams (New Zealand)

Assistant Referees
  Peter Allan (England)
  Paul Dix (England)
  Tom Foley (England)
  Greg Garner (England)
  Andrew Jackson (England)
  Greg MacDonald (England)
  John Meredith (England)
  Matthew O'Grady (England)
  Ian Tempest (England)
  Phil Watters (England)

Television match officials
  Paul Adams (Wales)
  Trevor Fisher (England)
  David Grashoff (England)
  Rowan Kitt (England)
  Keith Lewis (England)
  John Mason (Wales)
  David Rose (England)
  David Sainsbury (England)
  Stuart Terheege (England)
  Geoff Warren (England)

Pool stage
The fixtures were released in December 2015.

All times are in British Summer Time (UTC+01)

Points were awarded in the Pool Stage via the standard points system: 
 4 points for a win
 2 points for a draw
 1 bonus scoring point for scoring 4 or more tries
 1 bonus losing point for losing by 7 or less points
 0 points for a loss above 7 points

If at completion of the Pool Stage two or more teams were level on points, the following tiebreakers were applied:

 The winner of the Match in which the two tied Teams have played each other;
 The Team which has the best difference between points scored for and points scored against in all its Pool Matches;
 The Team which has the best difference between tries scored for and tries scored against in all its Pool Matches;
 The Team which has scored most points in all its Pool Matches;
 The Team which has scored most tries in all its Pool Matches; and
 If none of the above produce a result, then it will be resolved with a toss of a coin.

Pool A
{| class="wikitable" style="text-align: center;"
|-
!width="200"|Team
!width="20"|Pld
!width="20"|W
!width="20"|D
!width="20"|L
!width="20"|PF
!width="20"|PA
!width="32"|PD
!width="20"|TF
!width="20"|TA
!width="20"|BP
!width="20"|Pts
|- style="background:#ccffcc"
|align=left| 
| 3 || 3 || 0 || 0 || 94 || 56 || +38 || 10 || 9 || 1 || 13
|- style="background:#ffe6bd"
|align=left| 
| 3 || 2 || 0 || 1 || 97 || 50 || +47 || 15 || 4 || 2 || 10
|- style="background:#ffe6bd"
|align=left| 
| 3 || 1 || 0 || 2 || 52 || 53 || –1 || 6 || 5 || 3 || 7
|- style="background:#fcc"
|align=left| 
| 3 || 0 || 0 || 3 || 16 || 100 || –84 || 1 || 14 || 1 || 1
|}

Pool B
{| class="wikitable" style="text-align: center;"
|-
!width="200"|Team
!width="20"|Pld
!width="20"|W
!width="20"|D
!width="20"|L
!width="20"|PF
!width="20"|PA
!width="32"|PD
!width="20"|TF
!width="20"|TA
!width="20"|BP
!width="20"|Pts
|- style="background:#ccffcc"
|align=left| 
| 3 || 3 || 0 || 0 || 109 || 23 || +86 || 12 || 2 || 2 || 14
|- style="background:#ffe6bd"
|align=left| 
| 3 || 2 || 0 || 1 || 42 || 73 || –31 || 6 || 9 || 1 || 9
|- style="background:#ffe6bd"
|align=left| 
| 3 || 1 || 0 || 2 || 61 || 42 || +19 || 7 || 4 || 3 || 7
|- style="background:#fcc"
|align=left| 
| 3 || 0 || 0 || 3 || 39 || 113 || –74 || 5 || 15 || 0 || 0
|}

Pool C
{| class="wikitable" style="text-align: center;"
|-
!width="200"|Team
!width="20"|Pld
!width="20"|W
!width="20"|D
!width="20"|L
!width="20"|PF
!width="20"|PA
!width="32"|PD
!width="20"|TF
!width="20"|TA
!width="20"|BP
!width="20"|Pts
|- style="background:#ccffcc"
| align="left" | 
| 3 || 3 || 0 || 0 || 82 || 48 || +34 || 8 || 6 || 1 ||13
|- style="background:#ccffcc"
|align=left| 
| 3 || 2 || 0 || 1 || 112 || 69 || +43 || 14 || 8 || 3 ||11
|- style="background:#fcc"
| align="left" | 
| 3 || 1 || 0 || 2 || 92 || 78 || +14 || 13 || 9 || 2 ||6
|- style="background:#fcc"
|align=left| 
| 3 || 0 || 0 || 3 || 53 || 144 || –91 || 8 || 20 || 0 ||0
|}

Current combined standings

Knockout stage

9–12th place play-offs

Semi-finals

11th place game

9th place game

5–8th place play-offs

Semi-finals

7th place game

5th place game

Finals

Semi-finals

3rd place game

Final

References

External links
Official website

2016
2016 rugby union tournaments for national teams
2015–16 in English rugby union
International rugby union competitions hosted by England
rugby union
rugby union
rugby union